Dancing on Ice in the Netherlands and Belgium is broadcast by the Dutch TV channel RTL 4 and the Belgian TV channel VTM and hosted by Martijn Krabbe and Francesca Vanthielen. The members of the jury are: Joan Haanappel, Sjoukje Dijkstra, Thierry Smits, Katrien Pauwels and Jeroen Prins. The format derives from the British programme of the same name broadcast by ITV.

Dancing on Ice in the Netherlands was re-commissioned for the 2019–2020 season by SBS6 in the Netherlands, following a deal with ITV Studios Global Entertainment. The first show in the series was broadcast on December 7, 2019, hosted by Winston Gerschtanowitz and Patty Brard. The members of the judging panel were Marc Forno, Joan Haanapel and Ruben Reus.

Participants

2019 - 2020 Participants

References

External links 
 Dancing on Ice at RTL Nederland

Flemish television shows
Dutch reality television series
Belgian reality television series
2006 Belgian television series debuts
2006 Belgian television series endings
2006 Dutch television series debuts
2006 Dutch television series endings
2000s Belgian television series
2000s Dutch television series
RTL 4 original programming
VTM (TV channel) original programming
Dancing on Ice